"Les Six" is a name given to a group of six composers, five of them French and one Swiss, who lived and worked in Montparnasse. The name, inspired by Mily Balakirev's The Five, originates in two 1920 articles by critic Henri Collet in Comœdia (see Bibliography). Their music is often seen as a neoclassic reaction against both the musical style of Richard Wagner and the impressionist music of Claude Debussy and Maurice Ravel.

The members were Georges Auric (1899–1983), Louis Durey (1888–1979), Arthur Honegger (1892–1955), Darius Milhaud (1892–1974), Francis Poulenc (1899–1963), and Germaine Tailleferre (1892–1983).

In 1917, when many theatres and concert halls were closed because of World War I, Blaise Cendrars and the painter Moïse Kisling decided to put on concerts at 6 , the studio of the painter Émile Lejeune (1885–1964). For the first of these events, the walls of the studio were decorated with canvases by Picasso, Matisse, Léger, Modigliani, and others. Music by Erik Satie, Honegger, Auric, and Durey was played.

Les Six
According to Milhaud:

But, that is only one reading of how the Groupe des Six originated. Other authors, like Ornella Volta, stressed the manoeuvrings of Jean Cocteau to become the leader of an avant-garde group devoted to music, like the cubist and surrealist groups which had sprung up in visual arts and literature shortly before, with Pablo Picasso, Guillaume Apollinaire, and André Breton as their key representatives. The fact that Satie had abandoned the Nouveaux jeunes less than a year after starting the group, was the "gift from heaven" that made it all come true for Cocteau: his 1918 publication, Le Coq et l'Arlequin, is said to have 

After World War I, Jean Cocteau and Les Six began to frequent a bar known as "La Gaya" which became Le Bœuf sur le Toit (The Ox on the Roof) when the establishment moved to larger quarters. As the famous ballet by Milhaud had been conceived at the old premises, the new bar took on the name of Milhaud's ballet. On the renamed bar's opening night, pianist Jean Wiéner played tunes by George Gershwin and Vincent Youmans while Cocteau and Milhaud played percussion. Among those in attendance were impresario Serge Diaghilev, artist Pablo Picasso, filmmaker René Clair, singer Jane Bathori, and actor and singer Maurice Chevalier. Another frequent guest was the young American composer Virgil Thomson whose compositions were influenced by members of Les Six in subsequent years.

Collaborations
Although the group did not exist to work on compositions collaboratively, there were six occasions, spread over 36 years, on which at least some members of the group did work together on the same project. On only one of these occasions was the entire Groupe des Six involved; in some others, composers from outside the group also participated.

Auric and Poulenc were involved in all six of these collaborations, Milhaud in five, Honegger and Tailleferre in three, but Durey in only one.

1920: L'Album des Six
In 1920 the group published an album of piano pieces together, known as L'Album des Six. This was the only work in which all six composers collaborated.

 Prélude (1919) – Auric
 Romance sans paroles, Op. 21 (1919) – Durey
 Sarabande, H 26 (1920) – Honegger
 Mazurka (1914) – Milhaud
 Valse in C, FP 17 (1919) – Poulenc
 Pastorale, Enjoué (1919) – Tailleferre

1921: Les mariés de la tour Eiffel
In 1921, five of the members jointly composed the music for Cocteau's ballet Les mariés de la tour Eiffel, which was produced by the Ballets suédois, the rival to the Ballets Russes. Cocteau had originally proposed the project to Auric, but as Auric did not finish rapidly enough to fit into the rehearsal schedule, he then divided the work up among the other members of Les Six. Durey, who was not in Paris at the time, chose not to participate. The première was the occasion of a public scandal rivalling that of Le sacre du printemps in 1913. In spite of this, Les mariés de la tour Eiffel was in the repertoire of the Ballets suédois throughout the 1920s.

 Overture (14 July) – Auric
 Marche nuptiale – Milhaud
 Discours du General (Polka) – Poulenc
 La Baigneuse de Trouville – Poulenc
 La Fugue du Massacre – Milhaud
 La Valse des Depeches – Tailleferre
 Marche funèbre – Honegger
 Quadrille – Tailleferre
 Ritournelles – Auric
 Sortie de la Noce – Milhaud

1927: L'éventail de Jeanne
In 1927, Auric, Milhaud and Poulenc, along with seven other composers who were not part of Les Six, jointly composed the children's ballet L'éventail de Jeanne.

 Fanfare – Maurice Ravel
 Marche – Pierre-Octave Ferroud
 Valse – Jacques Ibert
 Canarie – Alexis Roland-Manuel
 Bourrée – Marcel Delannoy
 Sarabande – Albert Roussel
 Polka – Milhaud
 Pastourelle – Poulenc
 Rondeau – Auric
 Finale: Kermesse-Valse – Florent Schmitt

1949: Mouvements du coeur
In 1949, Auric, Milhaud and Poulenc, along with three other composers, jointly wrote Mouvements du coeur: Un hommage à la mémoire de Frédéric Chopin, 1849–1949, a suite of songs for baritone or bass and piano on words of Louise Lévêque de Vilmorin in commemoration of the centenary of the death of Frédéric Chopin.

 Prélude – Henri Sauguet
 Mazurka – Poulenc
 Valse – Auric
 Scherzo impromptu – Jean Françaix
 Étude – Léo Preger
 Ballade nocturne – Milhaud
 Postlude: Polonaise – Henri Sauguet

1952: La guirlande de Campra
In 1952, Auric, Honegger, Poulenc, Tailleferre and three other composers collaborated on an orchestral work called La guirlande de Campra.

 Toccata – Honegger
 Sarabande et farandole – Jean-Yves Daniel-Lesur
 Canarie – Alexis Roland-Manuel
 Sarabande – Tailleferre
 Matelote provençale – Poulenc
 Variation – Henri Sauguet
 Écossaise – Auric

1956: Variations sur le nom de Marguerite Long
In 1956, Auric, Milhaud, Poulenc and five other composers created an orchestral suite in honour of the pianist Marguerite Long, called Variations sur le nom de Marguerite Long
 Hymne solennel – Jean Françaix
 Variations en forme de Berceuse pour Marguerite Long – Henri Sauguet
 La Couronne de Marguerites ("The Crown of Daisies"), Valse en forme de rondo – Milhaud
 Nocturne – Jean Rivier
 Sérénades – Henri Dutilleux
 Intermezzo – Jean-Yves Daniel-Lesur
 Bucolique, FP. 160 – Poulenc
 ML (Allegro: Finale) – Auric

Selected music by individual members of Les Six

Salade by Milhaud; premiered 1924 in a production of Count Etienne de Beaumont
La nouvelle Cythère by Tailleferre; written in 1929 for the Ballets Russes and unproduced because of Diaghilev's sudden death
Cinq bagatelles by Auric
Les biches, ballet (1922/23) by Poulenc
Le Bal Masqué, cantate profane sur des poèmes de Max Jacob (Baritone, ensemble) (1932) by Poulenc
Scaramouche by Milhaud
Le bœuf sur le toit by Milhaud
Sonate pour violon seul by Honegger
Danse de la chèvre (Dance of the Goat) for solo flute by Honegger
Sonate champêtre for Oboe, Clarinet, Bassoon and Piano by Tailleferre

See also

 American Five
 The Five (composers)
 Grupo de los Ocho

Bibliography
 Jean Cocteau: Le Coq et l'Arelquin: Notes autour de la musique (Paris: Éditions de la Sirène, 1918).
 Henri Collet: "La Musique chez soi (XII): Un livre de Rimsky et un livre de Cocteau – Les Cinq russes, les Six français, et Erik Satie", in: Comœdia, 16 January 1920, p. 2.
 Henri Collet: "La Musique chez soi (XIII): "Les 'Six' français – Darius Milhaud, Louis Durey, Georges Auric, Arthur Honegger, Francis Poulenc et Germaine Tailleferre", in: Comœdia, 23 January 1920, p. 2.
 Fondation Erik Satie (ed.): Le Groupe des Six et ses amis: 70e anniversaire (Paris: Placard, 1990), .
 Ornella Volta: Satie/Cocteau. Les Malentendus d'une entente (Bègles: Le Castor Astral, 1993), .
 Benjamin Ivry: Francis Poulenc (London: Phaidon Press, 1996), .
 Roger Nichols: The Harlequin Years: Music in Paris 1917–1929 (London: Thames & Hudson, 2002), .
 Robert Shapiro: Les Six: The French Composers and their Mentors Jean Cocteau and Erik Satie (London/Chicago: Peter Owen, 2011), .
 Jane F. Fulcher: The Composer as Intellectual. Music and Ideology in France, 1914–1940 (New York: Oxford University Press, 2005).
 Barbara L. Kelly: Music and Ultra-Modernism in France, a Fragile Consensus, 1913–1939 (Woodbridge: Boydell Press, 2013).

References

External links
 Les Six, Satie, and Cocteau – by Stéphane Villemin 
 Le Groupe des Six - Une évocation par diverses personnalités on YouTube